S. Gunasekaran can mean:

 S. Gunasekaran (Communist Party of India politician)
 S. Gunasekaran (AIADMK politician)